James Brochin (born February 22, 1964) is an American politician from Maryland and a member of the Democratic Party. He was an unsuccessful candidate in the 2018 Democratic primary election for county executive of Baltimore County, losing to John A. Olszewski Jr. by a 17 votes of the 87,222 ballots cast in a four-way race.

Brochin served three terms in the Maryland State Senate, representing Maryland's district 42 in Baltimore County, being replaced in 2019 by Chris West.

During the 2010 campaign, Brochin raised $344,316, had $131,245 on hand, and spent $225,413 on his campaign.

On his website, he writes: "Over the last 9 years, I have always voted my conscience placing my constituents’ best interests above anything else. As I promised 9 years ago, my votes have reflected fiscal conservatism combined with a great concern for protecting open space and saving the Chesapeake Bay. I continue to remain an independent thinker, placing policy before party."

Background
Born in Baltimore, Brochin earned a B.A. from the University of North Carolina at Greensboro (in political science) in 1986, and earned an M.A at the University of Maryland, College Park (government and politics) in 1990.

In 1989 he was a legislative analyst for the Maryland Senate president as well as a political analyst for WCBM Radio. From 1990 to 1991 he was a lobbyist in Baltimore County. From 1990 to 1998 he was a political science instructor at the Catonsville campus of the Community College of Baltimore County. From 1994 to 2011 he taught at Towson University. From 2000 to the present he has been an insurance broker. From 1994 to 2001 he was a senior political writer for Baltimore Magazine.

In 2003, he was dubbed Legislator of the Year by the Maryland State Attorneys Association. In 2004, he was dubbed the Legislator of the Year by the American Institute of Architects. Since 2005, he has been a member of the National Conference of State Legislatures.

Committee membership
Member, Judicial Proceedings Committee (2007–)
Joint Committee on Administrative, Executive and Legislative Review (2003-)
Special Committee on Substance Abuse (2007–)
Member, Judicial Proceedings Committee (2003–2004)
Joint Committee on Federal Relations (2003–2006)
Education, Health and Environmental Affairs Committee (2004–2006) 
Member, Maryland Bicycle and Pedestrian Caucus (2004–)
Member, National Conference of State Legislatures (law & criminal justice committee (2005–)
Legislative effectiveness & state government committee (2005–2007)
Legislative effectiveness committee (2007–)
Member, Environmental Restoration and Development Task Force (2003)

Legislative career 2002–2019
Brochin has served three terms as a state senator representing the 42nd legislative district.

Election of 2002
In 2002, he very narrowly won the seat for state senator with 22,709 votes, Martha Scanlan Klima, the Republican incumbent, had 21,781 votes.

Election of 2006
In 2006, he won against Douglas B. Riley, a Republican, who garnered 19,084 votes or 43.7%. Brochin garnered 24,588 votes or 56.3% and write-ins included 30 voters or 0.1% of the electorate.

Positions in 2007 legislative session

 Supported an initiative that would require that a child with a disability in a home school setting be given the same consideration as a child with a disability in a private school setting for the purpose of passing through federal funds for the provision of specified federally authorized special education services
 Supported an initiative that would authorize a nonprofit association to institute, defend, intervene, or participate in specified governmental proceedings under specified circumstances or forms of alternative dispute resolution
 Supported an initiative that would add the first-degeee assault and the attempt to commit specified offenses to the offenses for which it is lawful for an investigative or law enforcement officer to intercept a wire, oral, or electronic communication in order to provide evidence
 Supported an initiative that would allow evidence of a defendant's act of sexual misconduct with a minor in a prosecution for specified sexual offenses involving a minor(s)
 Supported an initiative that would alter the standing requirements for an aggrieved person, a community association, and a homeowners association to appeal to the circuit court a decision of a local board of appeals, a zoning action of a local legislative body, or any matter arising under the planning and zoning laws of a local jurisdiction
 Supported an initiative that would prohibit an organization that collects dues from its members from engaging in campaign finance activity except through an affiliated political action committee, subjecting a specified membership entity to specified campaign finance reporting requirements and repealing specified exceptions relating to a political club
 Supported an initiative requiring that specified buildings be high performance buildings unless a unit of State government obtains a waiver from the Department of Budget and Management
 Supported a price preference as an incentive for the construction of new school buildings as high performance buildings; requiring the Board of Public Works to adopt specified regulations, prohibiting the State or a county board of education from authorizing an appropriation for the preliminary planning for new school construction for a high performance building
 Supported an initiative that would authorize the creation of State Debt of $500,000 as a grant to the board of trustees of Sheppard Pratt Health System, Inc. for the design of the Forbush School for autistic and emotionally disabled students, located in Towson and providing for disbursement of the loan proceeds
 Supported an initiative that would prohibiting a person from using an automated dialing system with a prerecorded message to call a residential telephone number in the State under specified circumstances and prohibiting a person from using an automated dialing system with a prerecorded message for political campaigns or political messages
 Supported an initiative that would prohibit the Motor Vehicle Administration from offering or authorizing the Driver Improvement Program/Point System Conferences Pilot Program provided over the Internet
 Supported an initiative that specified that a statute of limitations does not apply during a specified period of time for a specified person and authorizing a specified person to obtain a specified certificate for specified civil actions relating to child sexual abuse filed by a specified victim

Positions in 2008 legislative session

 Supported an initiative that would require that a child with a disability in a home school setting be given the same consideration as a child with a disability in a private school setting for the purpose of passing through federal funds for the provision of specified federally authorized special education services
 Supported an initiative that would require the Maryland Health Care Commission to include specified coverage of child dependents in the Comprehensive Standard Health Benefit Plan
 Supported an initiative that would alter the penalties for crimes relating to the possession of controlled dangerous substances, establishing minimum and maximum fines for possession crimes, require District Court clerks, circuit courts to remit specified fines to the counties to be distributed into specified funds established in each county and require establishment of a county residential drug abuse treatment services fund in each county that may be used only to fund residential drug treatment services in the county
 Supporting the prohibition of the Motor Vehicle Administration from issuing a new driver's license to an individual who cannot provide specified documentation certifying that the individual is lawfully present in the United States in accordance with federal law
 Supporting an initiative that would alter the venue for a postconviction proceeding
 Supporting an initiative that would add the first-degeee assault and the attempt to commit specified offenses to the offenses for which it is lawful for an investigative or law enforcement officer to intercept a wire, oral, or electronic communication in order to provide evidence
 Supporting an initiative that would increase specified fees for service of process of specified papers by a sheriff, require that $10 of the fees be distributed to a fund established under the Rental Allowance Program, establish the Rental Allowance Program Fund, providing for the purpose of the Fund
 Supporting an initiative that would require each new school building created by Baltimore County shall be a high performance building, prohibiting the State or the Baltimore County Board of Education from authorizing an appropriation for the preliminary planning of a new school building
 Supporting an initiative that would alter the portion of a sentence that must be served before individuals convicted of specified violent crimes can be paroled
 Supporting the establishment of exceptions to an exclusion of conduct involving the use of a motor vehicle from the crime of reckless endangerment
 Supporting the prohibition of a court from dismissing a criminal proceeding based on a violation of the right to a speedy trial unless the court holds a hearing and requiring the court to make detailed written findings before dismissing the case when the court is unable to provide a qualified interpreter for a defendant who cannot readily understand or communicate the English language
 Supporting an initiative that would authorize a nonprofit association to institute, defend, intervene, or participate in specified governmental proceedings under specified circumstances or forms of alternative dispute resolution
 Supporting an initiative that would grant a nonprofit association or homeowners association standing in court under specified circumstances and requiring a nonprofit or homeowners association to allege and prove specified conditions before being granted standing
 Supporting an initiative that would prohibit the forced sale or foreclosure of a property due to unpaid water, sewer, or other sanitary system bills
 Supporting the prohibition of an electric company from removing or clearing one or more trees on a public utility right-of-way or land except in accordance with specified procedures, requiring an electric company to send a notice to specified property owners and requiring that a copy of the notice be sent to the Public Service Commission and the Consumer Protection Division; also allowing an owner to submit a written request and allowing the division to issue a cease and desist order under specified circumstances
 Supporting an initiative that would authorize the creation of a State Debt of $450,000 dollars as a grant to the board of directors of St. Joseph Medical Center, Inc. for the planning, design, renovation, expansion, repair, construction, and capital equipping of an existing Cardiac Catheterization Prep and Recovery area

Positions in 2009 legislative session

 Supported decreasing the time limit by which the Office of Administrative Hearings is required to complete specified procedures in contested cases delegated to the Office by a State agency from 90 to 45 days
 Supported the prohibition of dredging by the Department of Natural Resources of buried oyster shells on Man-O-War Shoals as part of carrying out specified duties to increase the productivity or utility of the natural oyster bars of the State
 Supported a law that required a notary public applicant to receive approval from a specified state senator; repealing a provision of law requiring an individual appointed as a notary public to be a resident of the senatorial district from which the individual is appointed; requiring a notary public applicant to receive approval from the Secretary of State
 Supported prohibition of certain criminals from getting part of the Criminal Injuries Compensation Board and the disclosure of the identity or contact information of a specified victim or claimant by the Criminal Injuries Compensation Board
 Supported a law that required an inmate who is convicted of committing a specified crime of violence during a period in which the inmate was paroled for a previous conviction for a specified crime of violence to serve the full sentences for both crimes consecutively and is not entitled to a diminution of the inmate's terms of confinement for either crime and is not eligible for parole at any time for either crime during those sentences
 Supporting a law declaring that the interest rate for each month or fraction of a month owed for deficiencies in estimated income tax payments is the applicable federal underpayment rate in effect for the month
 Supported an initiative to require apartments with ten or more units to provide recycling bins and a civil penalty for not following the law
 Supported an initiative requiring the Health Services Cost Review Commission to prohibit a facility from charging a patient interest or late payment fees at a rate that exceeds a specified percentage
 Supported the increasing of the number of specified alcoholic beverages licenses to 10, altering to 65% the specified minimum percentage of the average daily receipts of a restaurant that must come from the sale of food and requiring that the Board of Liquor License Commissioners deny an application for the transfer and conversion of a license under specified circumstances (this became law)
 Supported an initiative that clarified that a person convicted of a specified prohibition against unlawfully obtaining property from a vulnerable adult shall be disqualified from inheriting, taking, enjoying, receiving, or otherwise benefiting from the estate, insurance proceeds, or property of the vulnerable adult under specified circumstances
 Supported an initiative that would authorize the governing body of Baltimore County to grant, by law, a property tax credit against the county tax imposed on personal and real property that is owned by the Northeast Youth Association, Inc.
 Supported the prohibition of a police officer from conducting or supervising a strip search or body cavity search of a person arrested for a misdemeanor or traffic offense or for a specified traffic offense with certain exceptions and only authorizing strip searches and body cavity searches only if specified conditions are met

Positions in 2010 legislative session

He was the lead sponsor of the following legislation.
 Supported an initiative that establishes that the Baltimore County Board of Liquor License Commissioners may require that for three restaurants in the Towson area, applicants for license transfer and issuance must demonstrate a minimum capital investment of $50,000
 Supported an initiative to give certain victims of domestic violence could get temporary housing up to 14 days
 Supported the placement of speed control cameras placed in work zones when there are workers present
 Supported an initiative that would regulate the circumstances and criteria needed for law enforcement and correctional officers to conduct a strip search and/or body cavity search
 Supported an initiative to require apartments with ten or more units to provide recycling bins
 Supported an initiative to require that a special election be held in the event of a U.S. Senate vacancy in Maryland
 Supported a statewide ban on foreclosures as a solution for unpaid water, sewer, or other sanitary bills
 Supported an increase in the age limit for a person to be considered a child dependent from 25 to 30 for purposes of being included on their parents’ health insurance policy
 Supported prohibition of certain criminals from getting part of the criminal injuries compensation fund
 Supported a restructuring of the registration process of child sex offenders and said that the public has a clear right to know when sex offenders are living next door or down the street
 Supported an increase in the term of imprisonment for a person who is involved in a vehicular accident that results in the death of another person
 Supported a prohibition of convicted child rapists and sex offenders from earning diminution credits while incarcerated
 Supported an initiative to re-couple the Maryland Estate Tax to the Federal Estate Tax using the applicable unified credit which corresponds to the exclusion amount
 Supported an initiative to alter the venue for a postconviction proceeding
 Supported an initiative that would allow evidence of a defendant's act of sexual misconduct with a minor in a prosecution for specified sexual offenses involving a minor(s)

Election of 2010
In 2010, Brochin won with 24,346 votes or 58.39% of the vote.

Support of medical marijuana
In 2010 during the debate over medical marijuana in the Maryland General Assembly, Senator Brochin professed his support for medical marijuana. In a mailed form letter on 6.9.10, Mr Brochin wrote: "I supported the medical marijuana bill which could relieve the suffering of our most vulnerable citizens. [The bill] allows someone who has pain through a chronic or terminal illness to be prescribed medical marijuana. Medical marijuana has been shown to stimulate appetite for those that must undergo chemotherapy."

LGBT issues
In 2011, The Washington Post reported that Brochin would support same sex-marriage in the state of Maryland: "Brochin said at a news conference that while he has been willing to support civil unions between gay couples previously, the word "marriage" was a "stumbling block". He later called testimony from same-sex marriage opponents "appalling and disgusting. ... I just heard hate and venom coming out of that hearing."

The Advocate found similar statements from the senator. In the article he is quoted as saying: "What I witnessed from the opponents of the bill was appalling ... Witness after witness demonized homosexuals, vilified the gay community, and described gays and lesbians as pedophiles. I believe that sexual orientation is not a choice, but rather people are born one way or another. The proponents of the bill were straightforward in wanting to be simply treated as everyone else, and wanted to stop being treated as second-class citizens. For me, the transition to supporting [same sex] marriage has not been an easy one, but the uncertainty, fear, and second-class status that gays and lesbians have to put up with is far worse and clearly must come to an end."

In March 2013, the Fairness for All Marylanders Act of 2013 (SB 449), came up for vote in the Senate Judicial Proceedings Committee. The bill, which would have added gender identity and expression to existing state law prohibiting discrimination in housing, employment and public accommodations, failed to pass the committee in a 5-6 vote. Brochin cast one of the six opposing votes, effectively blocking the bill from receiving a vote by the full Senate.

Positions in 2011 General Assembly session
Brochin's website lays out every bill the senator has supported. Some positions he held were controversial.

Positions in 2012 General Assembly session
 Proposed creating a Temporary Redistricting Commission in the year following a U.S. Census which would be required to hold public hearings to collect public input before redrawing election district lines 
 Voted in favor of legalizing Same Sex Marriage

Positions in 2013 General Assembly session
 Sponsored legislation which would have authorized courts to order individuals with a mental disorder and who present a danger to life or safety to surrender firearms under certain circumstances
 Sponsored legislation to ban the practice of paying private speed camera contractors based on the number of tickets issued, and require speed camera citation images to contain sufficient information to allow ticket recipients to identify or prove speed measurement errors
 Voted against the Transportation Infrastructure Investment Act of 2013, which increased the state gas tax 
 Voted against repeal of the death Penalty.

Meeting with BGE officials at Towson High School
As an effort to mitigate the anger of the populace against Baltimore Gas and Electric (BGE) owned by Constellation energy, Brochin held a meeting in Towson High School. The Baltimore Sun reported "The meeting, held at Towson High School, was attended by dozens of residents who spent the first week of September in the dark — and won't let BGE forget about it...But after the presentation [by BGE officials] some level of vitriol was common from the speakers ... For his part, Brochin said one of the reasons to bring up Irene three months later is to evaluate priorities for restoration after such outages."

The Towson Patch also had an article on the subject, "State Sen. James Brochin moderated a Monday evening town hall with representatives of BGE at Towson High School, where officials listened to complaints and concerns of more than 30 residents and promised to do better ... During the question-and-answer session, which lasted for more than an hour, residents grilled [BGE officials] Carostens and McDaniel on what happened during the August storm and the lessons learned."
 One person posted audio of the whole meeting in a number of different videos on YouTube.

Candidacy for Baltimore county executive (2018)
Brochin ran in the 2018 Democratic primary election for Baltimore county executive. In a candidates' forum on June 6, 2018, he had pledged to end what he termed "Pay-to-play politics", saying that developers have gained advantage by making large campaign donations.

Brochin lost to John Olszewski Jr. by 17 votes of the 87,222 ballots cast in a four-way race. Because of the narrow margin, a recount was conducted by election officials, who announced the result on July 14, 2018.:

References

Democratic Party Maryland state senators
Living people
Politicians from Baltimore
University of Maryland, College Park alumni
University of North Carolina at Greensboro alumni
1964 births
Towson University faculty
21st-century American politicians